Daniel "Dan" Davies (birth unknown – death unknown) was a Welsh professional rugby league footballer who played in the 1910s.

International honours
Dan Davies won a cap for Other Nationalities while at Swinton.

Genealogical information
Dan Davies was the brother of the Llanelli RFC, Wales (RL) Swinton, Wales (soccer), and Bolton Wanderers footballer, David "Dai" Davies.

Outside of sport
Dan Davies served with his brother in the 2nd Salford battalion (Swinton Pals), the 19th Lancashire Fusiliers during World War I, and was discharged due to bronchitis contracted in the trenches.

Note
Dan Davies played at Swinton in the same era as, but he was not related to, David B. Davies.

References

External links
Search for "Davies" at rugbyleagueproject.org
Photograph 'Team Photo 1906-07' at swintonlionstales.co.uk

British Army personnel of World War I
Lancashire Fusiliers soldiers
Other Nationalities rugby league team players
Place of birth missing
Place of death missing
Rugby league five-eighths
Swinton Lions players
Welsh rugby league players
Year of birth missing
Year of death missing